The 2005 WNBA season was the sixth season for the Seattle Storm. They were able to reach the playoffs, but were unable to defend their title from the year before.

Offseason

WNBA Draft

Regular season

Season standings

Season schedule

Player stats

References

Seattle Storm seasons
Seattle
2005 in sports in Washington (state)